Cian Dorgan (born 1996) is an Irish hurler and Gaelic footballer who plays for club side Ballincollig. He is a former member of the Cork senior football team.

Career
Dorgan first came to prominence with the Ballincollig minor hurling team that won the Premier 2 Championship title in 2012. He subsequently joined the club's senior teams in both codes and experienced his greatest success in 2014 when the Ballincollig senior football team won the County Senior Championship title. Two years later he was top scorer when the Ballincollig hurlers claimed the County Intermediate Championship. By this stage, Dorgan had also made an impression on the inter-county scene as a Gaelic footballer. In spite of not being included on the Cork minor team, he was an unused substitute on the Cork under-21 team that lost the 2016 All-Ireland final to Mayo. Dorgan also lined out with the Cork senior football team on a number of occasions during the 2018 National League.

Career statistics

Club

Inter-county

Honours
Ballincollig
Cork Senior Football Championship: 2014
Cork Intermediate Hurling Championship: 2018
Cork Premier 2 Minor Hurling Championship: 2012

Cork
McGrath Cup: 2018
Munster Under-21 Football Championship: 2016

References

1996 births
Living people
Ballincollig Gaelic footballers
Ballincollig hurlers
UCC Gaelic footballers
Cork inter-county Gaelic footballers
Dual players
Irish engineers